Ulf Lennart Nilsson (18 September 1948 – 22 September 2021) was a Swedish writer who published more than 100 books and picture books, geared mainly to children and adolescents. He was also the longtime president of the Swedish Academy for Children's Books. A number of his works have been translated into English by Gecko Press.

Nilsson died on 22 September 2021, at the age of 73.

Books
1979 – Pojkjävlarna
1982 – Älskade lilla gris
1983 – Lilla syster Kanin (together with Eva Eriksson)
1983 – En kamp för frihet
1985 – If You Didn't Have Me
1985 – Den fräcka kråkan
1986 – Boeing 747 (together with Pija Lindenbaum)
1994 – Mästaren och de fyra skrivarna
1996 – En dag med mössens brandkår
2001 – Varg nosar och jagar
1998 – En frälsare är född
2002 – Adjö, herr Muffin (together with Anna-Clara Tidholm)
2004 – En ängel vid din sida
2005 – En halv tusenlapp (together with Filippa Widlund)
2005 – Liten mus trycker på knappar
2006 – Den döde talar
2006 – Lilla syster kanin går alldeles vilse
2006 – Alla döda små djur
2007 – Ensam bland rävar

English translations
2006 – All the Dear Little Animals, (Gecko Press) 32pp., 
2020 – All the Dear Little Animals, chapter book edition (Gecko Press) 64pp., 
2015 – Detective Gordon: The First Case, (Gecko Press) 96pp., 
2016 – Detective Gordon: A Complicated Case, (Gecko Press) 96pp., 
2017 – Detective Gordon: A Case in Any Case, (Gecko Press)108pp., 
2018 – Detective Gordon: A Case for Buffy, (Gecko Press) 112pp.,

Awards
Nilsson has received the August Prize (Augustpriset) twice, the only writer for children and young adults to have been so recognized, and a distinction he shares with only four other writers for readers of any age.

1983 – BMF-plaketten (jointly with illustrator Eva Eriksson) for Lilla syster kanin
1984 – Nils Holgersson-plaketten for Lilla syster Kanin and En kamp för frihet
1985 – Expressens Heffaklump for Om ni inte hade mig and Den fräcka kråkan
1994 – Augustpriset for Mästaren och de fyra skrivarna
2002 – Augustpriset for Adjö, herr Muffin
2002 – BMF-plaketten
2002 – Bokjuryn (category 0–6 years)
2006 – The Astrid Lindgren Prize for his authorship of child and youth literature
2010 – Schullströmska prize for Children's Literature

References

External links

Ulf Nilsson author biography

1948 births
2021 deaths
Swedish children's writers
Swedish-language writers
People from Helsingborg
August Prize winners
20th-century Swedish writers
20th-century Swedish male writers
21st-century Swedish writers
21st-century Swedish male writers